The 2023 College Football Playoff National Championship was a college football bowl game played on January 9, 2023, at SoFi Stadium in Inglewood, California. The ninth College Football Playoff National Championship, the game determined the national champion of the NCAA Division I Football Bowl Subdivision (FBS) for the 2022 season. Aside from any all-star games following after, it was the culminating game of the 2022–23 bowl season. The game began at 4:45 p.m. PST and was televised by ESPN. Sponsored by telecommunications company AT&T, the game was officially known as the 2023 College Football Playoff National Championship presented by AT&T. 

The game featured the No. 1 and defending national champion Georgia Bulldogs of the Southeastern Conference (SEC) (winners of the Peach Bowl) and the No. 3 TCU Horned Frogs of the Big 12 Conference (winners of the Fiesta Bowl). Georgia defeated TCU, 65–7. The 58 point victory for Georgia is the most lopsided win in a College Football Playoff National Championship Game, the largest margin of victory in a title game, and the largest margin of victory in any bowl game at the FBS level. Georgia became just the third college football team to complete a 15–0 season in the modern era, the most recent having been the 2019 LSU Tigers. They also became the first team since the 2012 Alabama Crimson Tide to repeat as national champions.

The broadcast of the game on ESPN, saw the smallest audience in the game's history, coming at 16.6 million viewers.

Background
This was the fourth consecutive College Football Playoff National Championship matching the  3 seed and the No. 1 seed. The first was the 2020 edition, where the top-ranked LSU Tigers beat the third-ranked Clemson Tigers by a score of 42–25 at Mercedes-Benz Superdome in New Orleans. The second was the 2021 edition, where the top-ranked Alabama beat the third-ranked Ohio State by a score of 52–24 at Hard Rock Stadium in Miami Gardens. The third was when No. 3 Georgia beat No. 1 Alabama, 33–18, in the 2022 edition at Lucas Oil Stadium in Indianapolis.

Host selection
On November 1, 2017, SoFi Stadium was selected as host for the ninth edition of the championship, alongside the aforementioned 2021 and 2022 sites and NRG Stadium in Houston for 2024.

College Football Playoff
The four teams competing in the Playoff were selected by the CFP selection committee, whose final rankings were released on December 4, 2022, at 12:00 p.m. EST.

The semifinals were played on December 31, 2022. In the first semifinal, played at the Fiesta Bowl, TCU upset Michigan as 7.5 point underdogs, 51–45, in the highest scoring Fiesta Bowl, and second-highest CFP semifinal game. In the second semifinal, played at the Peach Bowl, Georgia rallied to overcome a 14-point deficit in the fourth quarter and defeat Ohio State 42–41.

Bracket

Venue

SoFi Stadium is a 70,240-seat venue in the Los Angeles suburb of Inglewood. Opened in September 2020, the fixed-roof stadium is home to the National Football League (NFL)'s Los Angeles Rams and Los Angeles Chargers, as well as the annual LA Bowl in college football. It had previous hosted Super Bowl LVI on February 13, 2022.

Teams

The championship game matched TCU from the Big 12 Conference and Georgia from the Southeastern Conference (SEC). The programs had previously met four times, most recently in the December 2016 edition of the Liberty Bowl, with Georgia winning each of the prior matchups.

TCU

The TCU Horned Frogs, under the leadership of first-year head coach Sonny Dykes, finished the regular season with an unblemished 12–0 record and finished Big 12 play at 9–0. That record put them atop the Big 12 and into the conference championship game, where they fell to Kansas State in an upset, leaving TCU with a 12–1 record. It did not impact their No. 3 ranking, as they were selected to that spot in the College Football Playoff (CFP). In the Fiesta Bowl semifinal, the Horned Frogs defeated No. 2 Michigan, 51–45.

This game was the first time a Big 12 team appeared in an FBS championship game since the 2010 BCS National Championship Game; the most recent national championship game won by a Big 12 team was the 2006 Rose Bowl (when the current FBS was still known as Division I-A). In the history of college football national championships at the highest level of competition, TCU has been named a national champion by one or more NCAA-recognized selectors three times: 1935, 1938, and 2010. TCU claims national championships for their 1935 and 1938 teams.

Georgia

Georgia was undefeated in their 12-game regular season, facing and defeating two ranked FBS teams, Oregon and Tennessee. Their closest victory was by four points, over Missouri; all of their other wins were by at least 10 points. Georgia qualified for the SEC Championship Game, where they defeated LSU, 50–30. Georgia entered the Peach Bowl semifinal with an overall 13–0 record, and were matched with No. 4 Ohio State. After Ohio State held a 38–24 lead in the third quarter, Georgia rallied for a 42–41 win, after Ohio State kicker Noah Ruggles' potential game-winning 50-yard field goal with 3 seconds left in the game sailed wide left.

Georgia became the first team to win back-to-back FBS championships since the 2011 Alabama and 2012 Alabama teams, and the first in the CFP era. In addition to the Bulldogs' 2021 season championship, Georgia claims national championships for their 1942 season and 1980 season.

Georgia's 58-point margin of victory was the largest of any bowl game ever.

Starting lineups

Source:

Game summary

First half
Georgia won the toss and elected to defer, and the opening kick by Jack Podlesny was a touchback. A TCU false start penalty by center Steve Avila, set them back to the TCU 20, to start the game. This would result in a three-and-out by quarterback Max Duggan. A fair catch by Kearis Jackson started Georgia's drive at their own 43. Xavier Truss would also be called for false start, moving the ball back to their own 38. That did not matter, as 4 quick plays set-up Stetson Bennett's 21 yard touchdown run, and Georgia got the early lead, 7-0. TCU's next drive would be another disaster. Max Duggan gets sacked on the first play of the drive for -6 yards. Then, he connects to Derius Davis for 2 yards. However, a Defensive Holding penalty by Javon Bullard would give them a first down. But, Javon Bullard got right back and recovered the ensuing fumble by Derius Davis. Another 5 plays would setup Jack Podlesny's 26-yd field goal, to give them a 10-0 lead. A 60 yard pass by Derius Davis on TCU's next drive would setup Max Duggan's 2-yd TD run, to cut the lead to 3 points, 10-7. It would be their only points of the game. A four play Georgia drive would couple with a wide-open 37-yd TD catch by Ladd McConkey to end the first quarter 17-7. After another TCU punt, and after an 11 play drive, which included a 35-yard pass from Brock Bowers, then setup Stetson Bennett's 6-yd untouched touchdown, to extend their lead by 17 points (24-7).  Emari Demercado would run for 3 yards on TCU's next drive, but an offensive holding penalty pushed them back to their own 15. After another play, Javon Bullard would get his first interception of the game. After another 11 play drive, would setup Kendall Milton's 1-yd touchdown run, to extend their lead by 24 points (31-7.) It would be the same thing for TCU's next drive, with Javon Bullard's second interception of the game. Stetson Bennett would connect with Adonai Mitchell for a 22-yd touchdown catch to end the first half with a 38-7 lead, coming into the break.

Second half

Since Georgia elected to defer, they got the ball back to start the second half. After both teams traded punts, and after a 3 play drive for Georgia, Stetson Bennett finds Brock Bowers for a 22 yd TD, to make it 45-7. After an offensive holding penalty to start TCU's drive at their own 18, another quick three and out occurred, giving Georgia the ball back at their own 16. This would come with a 9 play, 84 yard drive, which resulted in Ladd McConkey's second touchdown of the game, to make it 52-7. TCU's subsequent drives would both be turnover on downs, with Georgia touchdowns in between them. After Branson Robinson 19 yd TD run, Jack Podlesny's extra point try subsequently missed, making it 65-7. After another TCU punt, Georgia ran out the remaining clock, making the final score 65-7, and repeating as national champions.

Scoring summary

Statistics

Broadcasting

This was the ninth consecutive College Football Playoff National Championship game to be televised on ESPN, and offered its MegaCast coverage, which also televised the Playoff semifinals, and the championship game on all of its networks except ABC with alternate broadcasts; the primary telecast aired on ESPN while other channels in the ESPN family of networks aired alternate broadcasts.

Commentary teams
 ESPN: Chris Fowler (play-by-play), Kirk Herbstreit (analyst), and Holly Rowe and Molly McGrath (sidelines) 
 ESPN Radio: Sean McDonough (play-by-play), and Todd Blackledge (analyst), and Ian Fitzsimmons and Kris Budden (sidelines).
 ESPN2: "Field Pass" with The Pat McAfee Show, which featured Pat McAfee along with Robert Griffin III, Taylor Lewan, and A. Q. Shipley.
 ESPNU: Command Center, features the audio from the main telecast.
 ESPNews: SkyCast (branded as AT&T 5G SkyCast for sponsorship reasons, a continuous feed from the skycam), features audio from the main telecast.
 SEC Network: Georgia Hometown Radio, which features Scott Howard (play-by-play), Eric Zeier (analyst), and D. J. Shockley (sideline)
 Additionally, the All-22 broadcast (which aired with audio from the ESPN Radio broadcast), and both teams' Hometown Radio calls and Marching Bands were also available on the ESPN app.

See also
 2022 LA Bowl, contested at the same venue on December 17, 2022
 Super Bowl LVI, the NFL championship game contested at the same venue on February 13, 2022
 College football national championships in NCAA Division I FBS

References

National Championship
College Football Playoff National Championship
College Football Playoff National Championship
TCU Horned Frogs football bowl games
Georgia Bulldogs football bowl games
College Football Playoff National Championship
2020s in Los Angeles